Heather MacDougall is an American lawyer and former government official who currently serves as the vice president of worldwide employee health and safety for Amazon. She was a member of the Occupational Safety and Health Review Commission (OSHRC) from 2014 until 2019. She served as the acting chair of OSHRC from January 2017 until her resignation in March 2019. MacDougall was first nominated to the post by President Barack Obama and unanimously confirmed by the U.S. Senate in March 2014. In April 2017, President Donald Trump nominated her to continue as a commissioner for a second term. She was confirmed by the U.S. Senate for an additional term on the OSHRC on August 3, 2017. She resigned from OSHRC in March 2019 in order to join Amazon.

A graduate of the University of Wisconsin and Marquette University Law School, MacDougall has served as associate general counsel to the HR Policy Association, as chief counsel to former OSHRC Chairman W. Scott Railton, and as a labor, employment, and occupational safety and health law attorney at Akerman LLP.

References

Year of birth missing (living people)
Living people
University of Wisconsin–Madison alumni
Marquette University Law School alumni
21st-century American lawyers
Obama administration personnel
Trump administration personnel